Tushpuea (Armenian:Տուշպուեա) is an Araratian (Urartian) goddess from which the city of Tushpa derived its name. She may have been the wife of the solar god Shivini as both are listed as third, in the list of male and female deities on the Mheri-Dur inscription.  It is hypothesized that the winged female figures on Urartian ornaments and cauldrons depict this goddess.

References
Piotrovsky, Boris B. (1969) The Ancient Civilization of Urartu: An Archaeological Adventure. Cowles Book Co. 

Urartian deities